Maurice Murphy may refer to:

 Maurice Murphy (musician) (1935–2010), British musician, principal trumpet of the London Symphony Orchestra
 Maurice J. Murphy Jr. (1927–2002), New Hampshire Attorney General and United States Senator
 Maurice Murphy (director) (born 1939), Australian film and television director, producer, writer and actor
 Maurice Murphy (hurler), Irish hurler
 Maurice Murphy (actor) (1913–1978), American actor